Chris Schlesinger is a Boston-based chef and restaurateur.

Background
Born in Virginia, Schlesinger graduated from The Culinary Institute of America in 1977.  The nephew of historian Arthur M. Schlesinger, Jr., he started at Northeastern University but dropped out.
Early jobs after graduating from CIA include being the chef at the Sakonnet Golf Club in Rhode Island.

Restaurants
In 1986, East Coast Grill opened (in Inman Square, Cambridge, since closed); in 1989, Jake and Earl's Dixie BBQ (in Cambridge and Waltham, since closed) and in 1990, The Blue Room, in Kendall Square, with Stan Frankenthaler. In 1999 he opened the Back Eddy in Westport, MA, overlooking the Westport River.  With Dave Cagle, he opened The Automatic in Kendall Square.

Awards and honors
In 1996, Schlesinger won the James Beard Foundation Award for Best Chef of the Northeast.  He has appeared on the WGBH-TV show A Moveable Feast With Fine Cooking.  He was featured on the PBS show (episode 102) of How to Cook Everything: Bittman Takes On America's Chefs.

Bibliography
Along with John "Doc" Willoughby, he has written five cookbooks: the James Beard Cookbook Award winner, The Thrill of the Grill (Morrow, 1990); Salsas, Sambals, Chutneys, and Chowchows (Morrow, 1993); Big Flavors of the Hot Sun (Morrow, 1994); Lettuce in Your Kitchen (Morrow, 1996); and License to Grill (Morrow, 1997). They also have a monthly feature in The New York Times, and have written numerous articles for magazines such as GQ and Food & Wine. Chris is also a Contributing Editor for Saveur magazine.

References

American restaurateurs
Chefs from Massachusetts
American male chefs
Culinary Institute of America Hyde Park alumni
Living people
James Beard Foundation Award winners
Year of birth missing (living people)
Barbecue chefs
Inman Square